Tartarocreagris is a genus of pseudoscorpions in the family Neobisiidae. It contains the following species:

Tartarocreagris altimana Muchmore, 2001
Tartarocreagris amblyopa Muchmore, 2001
Tartarocreagris attenuata Muchmore, 2001
Tartarocreagris comanche Muchmore, 1992
Tartarocreagris cookei Muchmore, 2001
Tartarocreagris domina Muchmore, 2001
Tartarocreagris grubbsi Muchmore, 2001
Tartarocreagris hoodensis Muchmore, 2001
Tartarocreagris infernalis (Muchmore, 1969)
Tartarocreagris intermedia Muchmore, 1992
Tartarocreagris ozarkensis (Hoff, 1945)
Tartarocreagris proserpina Muchmore, 2001
Tartarocreagris reyesi Muchmore, 2001
Tartarocreagris texana (Muchmore, 1969)

References

Pseudoscorpion genera
Neobisiidae
Taxonomy articles created by Polbot